Björn Carlsson (born 13 January 1961) is a retired Swedish ice hockey player. Carlsson was part of the Djurgården Swedish champions' team of 1983. Carlsson made 160 Elitserien appearances for Djurgården.

References

External links

1961 births
AIK IF players
Djurgårdens IF Hockey players
Living people
Södertälje SK players
Swedish ice hockey forwards